Miss Supranational 2013 was the fifth Miss Supranational pageant. It was held on September 6, 2013 at the Minsk Sports Palace in Minsk, Belarus. Ekaterina Buraya of Belarus crowned Mutya Johanna Datul of the Philippines at the end of the event. She is the first Filipino and Asian to be crowned Miss Supranational.

Results

Placements

Continental Queens of Beauty

Special awards

Contestants 
83 delegates competed for the title.

Notes 

Debut

References

External links 

 
 Photos from final Miss Supranational 2013

2013
2013 beauty pageants